Dehnow-e Emamzadeh Mahmud (also Romanized as Dehnow-e Emāmzādeh Maḥmūd; also known as Deh-e Now) is a village in Poshteh-ye Zilayi Rural District, Sarfaryab District, Charam County, Kohgiluyeh and Boyer-Ahmad Province, Iran. At the 2006 census, its population was 34, in 7 families.

References 

Populated places in Charam County